Philip Brumwell (born 8 August 1975) is an English former professional footballer who made more than 200 appearances in the Football League playing as a midfielder for Darlington and Hull City.

References

1975 births
Living people
Association football midfielders
English footballers
Sunderland A.F.C. players
Hull City A.F.C. players
Darlington F.C. players
Blyth Spartans A.F.C. players
English Football League players